The Labor Organisation of Brothers-in-Arms (Finnish: , AT) was a Finnish nazi party operating from 1942, led by Arvi Nuorimo and JE Tuominen.

History
The party was found when the United Front party, led by Tuominen, merged with the supporters of the Nazi leader Nuorimo. The party was most active and popular in Tampere. A considerable number of workers for the aircraft manufacturing company Valtion lentokonetehdas were party members. The party was funded by consul Sylvester Mank.

The party leadership visited Germany in 1942 as guests of the Nazi leadership. The press agency  reported about the event and the Danish Nazi magazine  interviewed Nuorimo.

Party program
A peculiarity of the AT program was its emphasis on agrarianism and the rights and wellbeing of farmers, wanting to allow "only those who are farming the land or using it for a similar useful purpose" to own land.

References

External links
The party program (in Finnish)

Defunct political parties in Finland
Nationalist parties in Finland
Nazi parties
Political parties established in 1942
Nazism in Finland
Banned far-right parties
Anti-communist organisations in Finland